Bobby Harold Barbee Sr. (1927–2013) was a  Republican member of the North Carolina General Assembly representing the state's seventieth House district, including constituents in Stanly and Union counties. An insurance executive from Locust, North Carolina, Barbee served his ninth term in the state House from 2003 to 2004.

He retired in 2004 and died in 2013.

Electoral history

2004

2002

2000

References

|-

|-

1927 births
2013 deaths
People from Stanly County, North Carolina
20th-century American politicians
21st-century American politicians
Republican Party members of the North Carolina House of Representatives